Dr. Vina Mazumdar (28 March 1927 – 30 May 2013) was an Indian academic, left-wing activist and feminist. A pioneer in women's studies in India, she was a leading figure of the Indian women's movement. She was amongst the first women academics to combine activism with scholarly research in women's studies. She was secretary of the first Committee on the Status of Women in India that brought out the first report on the condition of women in the country, Towards Equality (1974). She was the founding Director of the Centre for Women's Development Studies (CWDS), an autonomous organisation established in 1980, under the Indian Council of Social Science Research (ICSSR). She was a National Research Professor at the Centre for Women's Development Studies, Delhi.

Early life and education
Vina Mazumdar was born in a middle-class Bengali household in Kolkata, the youngest of five children, three boys and two girls. Her father, Prakash Majumdar, was an engineer. Her uncle was the noted historian R.C. Majumdar (1888–1980). She did her schooling from St. John's Diocesan Girls' Higher Secondary School, Kolkata, then studied at Women's College, Banaras Hindu University, and subsequently at Asutosh College, the University of Calcutta, where she became the secretary of the Ashutosh College Girls Students Union. While at the college, she organised a meeting in the support of Rama Rao Committee which recommended expansion of the inheritance rights for daughters through crucial Hindu Law Reform. In 1947, just after independence, she went to St Hugh's College, Oxford, where she completed her graduation in 1951. She returned to Oxford University in 1960 and received her D.Phil. there in 1962.

Career
She started her career as a lecturer of Political Science in Patna University in 1951, soon becoming the first Secretary of the Patna University Teachers' Association. Later, she taught at Berhampur University, where she was appointed upon the recommendation of Professor Bidhu Bhusan Das, her friend from Oxford University, who was Director of Public Instruction, Odisha, at the time. Subsequently, she joined the University Grants Commission Secretariat, New Delhi as an Education Officer and became a Fellow of the Indian Institute of Advanced Studies, Shimla, for the research project, 'University Education and Social Change in India' (April 1970 – Dec. 1970).

She was Member Secretary for the Committee on the Status of Women in India (1971–74). The Committee, appointed by the Government of India in 1971, was reconstituted in 1973 with her, a late entrant, as Member Secretary. The report of the Committee, Towards Equality, highlighted the rise in poverty amongst women in the transition from agrarian to industrial society, as also the decline of sex ratio in India. Eventually, the report became a turning point both for Women's Studies and the women's movement in India. Later Mazumdar became Director, Programme of Women's Studies, Indian Council of Social Science Research from 1975 to 80. Mazumdar helped organise a meeting to support the recommendations of the Rama Rao Committee on Hindu Law Reform (to expand the inheritance rights of daughters.

In 1980, she co-founded the Centre for Women's Development Studies (CWDS), New Delhi and remained its founder-Director from 1980 till her retirement in 1991. CWDS initiated the concept of "action-research" as it organised landless peasant women in Bankura district of West Bengal. It soon became an influential institution which impacted the course of women's studies in India. Through her career, Mazumdar straddled both the scholarship and activism side of women's studies, which she referred as "women's studies movement". She was also a founding-member of the Indian Association of Women's Studies (IAWS, founded 1982). Thereafter she was Senior Fellow at CWDS and JP Naik National Fellow, ICSSR for two years. From 1996 to 2005 she was the Chairperson, Centre for Women's Development Studies, New Delhi.

She published her memoir, Memories of a Rolling Stone in 2010. [Reviews: Subhashini Ali: The third factor, Frontline, Volume 27 – Issue 15, 17–30 July 2010 ; Pamela Philipose: Vina Mazumdar's Rolling Story, 30 October 2010; Vina Mazumdar, the fighter, Times of India, 5 June 2010]

Personal life
She married musician Shankar Mazumdar in 1952, who she met while working in Patna. Upon her marriage, she changed the spelling of surname from Majumdar (her maiden name) to Mazumdar (her marital name). The couple had four children - three daughters and a son. One of her daughters was the first wife of Sitaram Yechuri, leader of Communist Party of India (Marxist). Dr. Mazumdar died at a hospital in Delhi on May 30, 2013, after a brief illness at the age of 86, and is survived by her children.

Bibliography
 Education & social change: three studies on nineteenth century India. Indian Institute of Advanced Study, 1972.
 Role of rural women in development. University of Sussex. Institute of Development Studies. Allied Publishers, 1978.
 Symbols of power: studies on the political status of women in India. Allied, 1979.
 Women and rural transformation: two studies with Rekha Mehra, Kunjulekshmi Saradamoni. ICSSR. Centre for Women's Development Studies. Pub. Concept, 1983.
 Emergence of the Women's Question in India and the Role of Women's Studies. Centre for Women's Development Studies, 1985.
 Khadi and Village Industries Commission. Centre for Women's Development Studies. 1988.
 Peasant Women Organise for Empowerment: The Bankura Experiment. Centre for Women's Development Studies. 1989.
 Women workers in India: studies in employment and status, with Leela Kasturi, Sulabha Brahme, Renana Jhabvala. ICSSR. Chanakya Publications, 1990. .
  Legislative Measures and Policy Directions for Improving the Lot of Farm Women, with Kumud Sarma, Lotika Sarkar. Indian Council of Agricultural Research.
 Women and Indian nationalism, with Leela Kasturi. Vikas Pub. House, 1994. .
 Changing Terms of Political Discourse: Women's Movement in India, 1970s–1990s, with Indu Agnihotri. Economic and Political Weekly, Vol. XXX No. 29, 4 March 1995
 Political Ideology of the Women's Movement's Engagement with Law. Centre for Women's Development Studies, 2000.
 Face to face with rural women: CWDS' search for new knowledge and an interventionist role. Centre for Women's Development Studies, 2002.
 The Mind and the Medium. Explorations in the Evolution of British Imperial Policy in India. Three Essays Collective. 2010. 
 Memories of a Rolling Stone. Zubaan Books. 2010. .

See also
 State feminism

References

Additional references
 A Pathmaker: tributes to Vina Mazumdar. Rainbow Publishers, 2002. .
 Vina Mazumdar Bibliography Deep Blue, Michigan University

Further reading
 Women's Movement in India: 1970s–1990s, by Indu Agnihotri and Vina Mazumdar Writing the women's movement: a reader, Ed. Mala Khullar. Zubaan, 2005. . p. 48–79''

External links
 Centre for Women's Development Studies, website
 Vina Mazumdar, Documentary Sparrow, India Duration: 92.07 min; Director: Vishnu Mathur; Genre: Documentary; Produced In: 2003. Sound and Picture Archive for Research on Women (SPARROW)
 Unlimited Girls – Interview with Veena Mazumdar, Part 1 Location: New Delhi; Duration: 68 min Director: Paromita Vohra (2002)
 Unlimited Girls – Interview with Veena Mazumdar, Part 2 Location: New Delhi; Duration: 42 min Director: Paromita Vohra (2002)

1927 births
2013 deaths
Alumni of St Hugh's College, Oxford
Asutosh College alumni
Banaras Hindu University alumni
Founders of learned societies
Indian women sociologists
Indian feminists
Scholars from Kolkata
Indian sociologists
Indian women's rights activists
Indian institute directors
Scientists from Kolkata
Academic staff of Patna University
University of Calcutta alumni
Women's studies academics
Indian women philanthropists
Indian philanthropists
Indian women activists
20th-century Indian educators
20th-century Indian women scientists
20th-century Indian social scientists
21st-century Indian women scientists
21st-century Indian social scientists
Indian women political writers
21st-century Indian women writers
21st-century Indian non-fiction writers
20th-century Indian women writers
20th-century Indian non-fiction writers
Indian political writers
Writers from Kolkata
Women writers from West Bengal
Activists from West Bengal
Educators from West Bengal
Indian women scholars
Women educators from West Bengal
20th-century women educators